The Northern Iowa Panthers men's basketball team represents the University of Northern Iowa located in Cedar Falls, Iowa. UNI is currently a member of the Missouri Valley Conference.

Postseason results

NCAA Division I Tournament
Northern Iowa has made the NCAA tournament eight times. The Panthers have a record of 5–8.

NCAA Division II Tournament

NIT Tournament history
Northern Iowa has made the NIT twice, with a record of 2-2.

CIT Tournament history

Other tournaments
 NAIA National Tournament appearances: 1946, 1948, 1949, and 1953 (2–4 combined tournament record)
Competed in the 2007 World University Games as Team USA (finished ninth)

Coaching history

Ben Jacobson era
Jacobson's biggest coaching accomplishment to date was in the 2009–10 season, when the Panthers made a run into the Sweet Sixteen of the NCAA tournament highlighted by an upset of top national seed Kansas. ESPN.com columnist Pat Forde called the Panthers' win "the biggest tourney upset in years," and called the clinching shot by Panthers guard Ali Farokhmanesh "the gutsiest early-round shot in NCAA tournament history."

Jacobson also coached UNI as it became the first college program ever to represent the United States of America at an international basketball competition. In August 2007, UNI was chosen to be Team USA at the World University Games in Bangkok, Thailand. Donning the Red, White and Blue, UNI went 5–1 in the tournament, losing only to eventual gold medalist Lithuania, while posting wins over Angola, Turkey, China, Finland and Israel.

On November 15, 2014, Jacobson became the all-time win leader for a coach in UNI Men's basketball history. After recording a win over his alma mater University of North Dakota, he notched his 167th UNI victory. Additionally, in the 2014–15 season, Jacobson led the Panthers to their highest ranking in school history (#10) in the AP and (#9) in the Coaches Poll. UNI also in that season achieved the most wins in the school's history with 31. Jacobson has also been awarded the Missouri Valley Conference coach of the year award in 2009, 2010, and 2015.

On November 21, 2015, Jacobson led UNI to a victory over #1 North Carolina. The win was one of the biggest in program history and came in just the first meeting of the two basketball programs. Just four days later the coach hit another career milestone. After defeating the University of Dubuque in convincing fashion, the coach recorded his 200th victory at the university.

In the first round of the MVC tournament, Jacobson notched his 250th Northern Iowa career win against Evansville on March 1, 2018.

Notable players
A. J. Green
Ali Farokhmanesh
Jon Godfread
Paul Jesperson
Adam Koch
Greg McDermott
Nick Nurse - Coached Toronto Raptors to 2019 NBA Championship and named NBA Coach of the Year in 2020.
Seth Tuttle
Wes Washpun
Eric Coleman
John Little
Grant Stout

Rivalries
The school has several statewide and national rivalries. In Iowa, UNI used to play two, if not three of its Iowa neighbors for the Iowa Big Four men's college basketball mythical championship. The university also used to play either the University of Iowa or Iowa State University in the Hyvee Big Four Classic held at Wells Fargo Arena in Des Moines. UNI’s MVC rivals are UIC, Bradley, Drake, and Missouri State.

References